Jean-Claude Chamboredon (October 1938 – 30 March 2020) was a French sociologist.

Biography
Chamboredon graduated from the École normale supérieure in Paris, and subsequently worked alongside Pierre Bourdieu until 1981. With Bourdieu and Jean-Claude Passeron, Chamboredon wrote Le Métier de sociologue in 1967. In addition to his various sociological works, Chamboredon translated Basil Bernstein's Langage et classes sociales.

Jean-Claude Chamboredon died on 30 March 2020 at the age of 81.

Publications
Un art moyen. Essai sur les usages sociaux de la photographie (1965)
Le Métier de sociologue (1967)
Développement économique et changement social. Classe sociale et changement social (1974)
La philosophie de l'histoire et les sciences sociales (2005)
Jeunesses et classes sociales (2015)
Territoires, culture et classes sociales (2019)

References

1938 births
2020 deaths
French sociologists